Oğuzhan Bıyık (born September 28, 1986 in Germany) is a Turkish footballer.  He currently plays for TSG Backnang.

References

1986 births
Living people
Turkish footballers
Turkish expatriate footballers
German people of Turkish descent
SG Sonnenhof Großaspach players
TSG 1899 Hoffenheim players
TSG 1899 Hoffenheim II players
1. FK Příbram players
Association football midfielders